The Sioux City Musketeers are a junior ice hockey team playing in the Western Conference of the United States Hockey League (USHL). The Musketeers' home ice is Tyson Events Center. The team was founded in 1972, and has won three Anderson Cups as the regular season champion, and four Clark Cups as the playoffs champion of the USHL.

History
Dave Siciliano served as head coach and general manager of the Musketeers from 2000 to 2008. Sioux City radio station KOOL 99.5 broadcast The Dave Siciliano Show on Mondays during the season, which included interviews with the coach and the team's players. He promised that his team would be in better physical condition and to outwork their opponents.

In the 2001–02 season playoffs, the Musketeers defeated the Sioux Falls Stampede in three consecutive games in the first round, defeated the Green Bay Gamblers in four games in the second round, then defeated the Omaha Lancers three games to two in the playoffs finals to win the Clark Cup. At the start of the season, Siciliano had not expected to reach the finals nor win the cup, but credited the team for being tight-knit and "just great quality kids" who handled adversity. During the fifth game of the finals, the Musketeers trailed by a 3–1 score in the third period, then tied up the game in the final six minutes and won in overtime. In a 2008 interview, Siciliano recalled that the Clark Cup victory in 2002 was his fondest memory with the team.

In the 2004–05 season playoffs, the Musketeers won the first round by three games to one versus the Lincoln Stars, and won the second round by three games to one versus the Tri-City Storm. The Cedar Rapids RoughRiders won the Clark Cup in the fifth and deciding game by a 4–1 score. Siciliano credited his team for not quitting despite the strong play of opposing goaltender Alex Stalock.

When Siciliano resigned in 2008, he had the second most career victories for a coach in the USHL, and had the most wins for a Musketeers coach with 272 victories. He stated that he was proud of designing the team's circular dressing room at the Gateway Arena so that one could "look your teammates directly in the eye"; and was credited by the Sioux City Journal for having "etched a distinct signature on Musketeer ice success for eight seasons".

In August 2014, the Musketeers captured a Bronze Medal as the USHL representative at the Junior Club World Cup in Ufa, Russia. 2014–15 team captain Neal Pionk was named the tournament's best defenseman, while Adam Johnson led the tournament in scoring, with 9 points in 5 games. Both were named to the All-Tournament team. Pionk went on to win the 2014–15 USHL Defenseman of the Year. Both Pionk and Johnson were named to the 2014–15 All-USHL First Team. Ryan Zuhlsdorf was named to the USHL All-Rookie First Team, while Bobo Carpenter earned All-Rookie Second Team honors.

Players

Roster
As of September 21, 2022.

|}

NHL alumni
The Musketeers have had 38 players reach the National Hockey League (NHL). John Grahame (G), Brock Boeser (F), Billy Tibbetts (F), David Hale (D), Rostislav Klesla (D), Ruslan Fedotenko (F), John Zeiler (F), Sam Gagner (F), Chris Butler (D), Dieter Kochan (G), Max Pacioretty (F), Tim Kennedy (F), Corey Elkins (F), Stephane Da Costa (F), Steven Kampfer (D), Patrick Davis (F), Sean Collins (D), Travis Turnbull (F), Danny DeKeyser (D), Max McCormick (F), Ryan Carpenter (F), Kevin Gravel (D), Jake Guentzel (C), Neal Pionk (D), Seth Helgeson (D), Jeff Zatkoff (G), Michael Kapla (D), Eeli Tolvanen (F), Joel L'Esperance (F), Kyle Criscuolo (F), Adam Johnson (F), Jordan Schmaltz (D), Matiss Kivlenieks (G), Alex Steeves (F), Walker Duehr (F), Akira Schmid (G), Bobby Brink (F), and Joe Snively (F).

NHL-drafted players
Over 50 Sioux City Musketeer players have been selected by teams in the annual NHL Draft, including two members of the 2006–07 team (Max Pacioretty-1st Rd., Phil DeSimone-3rd Rd.) at the 2007 NHL draft. Selected in the 2008 NHL draft, Steve Quailer (F)-3rd Rd. 86th overall pick, and a member of the 2007–08 team. In the 2009 NHL draft, Seth Helgeson (D) was selected in the 4th round. Helgeson played two years in Sioux City ('07–'09). In the 2011 NHL draft, Max McCormick (F)was selected in the 6th round. McCormick won the "7th Man" award as a member of the 2010–11 Musketeers. In the 2012 NHL draft, Cliff Watson (D) was selected in the 6th round. In the 2013 NHL draft, 3 Musketeers were selected, including 2012–13 USHL Rookie of the Year, Jake Guentzel (F)-3rd Rd. Blake Heinrich (D) and Avery Peterson (F) were picked in the 5th and 6th Rd. respectively. In the 2015 NHL draft, Ryan Zuhlsdorf (D) was selected in the 5th Rd.

Season-by-season record
The Sioux City Musketeers operated within the USHL as a senior ice hockey team 1972 to 1979.

Gold Cup tournament
The Gold Cup was the USA Hockey Junior A National Championship that the USHL participated in at the end of the season against the regular season and playoff champions of the other Junior A leagues. The USHL stopped participation in the tournament after USA Hockey realigned its designations and the USHL became a Tier I league in 2001. The Gold Cup was discontinued after the 2003 tournament when the remaining Tier II Junior A leagues merged. Sioux City participated in several Gold Cup tournaments, but only won in 1986.

Team records
Most points, season: 87 (201617)
Fewest points, season: 20 (199697)
Most wins, season: 42 (198586)
Fewest wins, season: 9 (199697)
Most losses, season: 45 (199697)
Fewest losses, season: 6 (198586)
Most goals scored, season: 358 (198586)
Fewest goals against, season: 125 (201617)
Most penalty minutes, season: 1,905 (199798)
Longest winning streak: 16
Longest losing streak: 12 (197980)
Longest home winning streak: 22
Longest Road winning streak: 6 (198586; 200607)
Longest home losing streak: 12 (199697)
Longest road losing streak: 14 (199697)
Single-game attendance record: 6,309 ( Clark Cup final game five vs. Chicago Steel)
Single-season attendance record: 82,102 (200607)

References

External links
 

1972 establishments in Iowa
Ice hockey clubs established in 1972
Ice hockey teams in Iowa
Sports in Sioux City, Iowa
United States Hockey League teams